Geopolitics Quarterly is a peer-reviewed academic journal published by the Iranian Association of Geopolitics.

Abstracting and indexing
The journal received Q1 Grade in the latest evaluation of the Islamic World Science Citation Center. The journal is abstracted and indexed in Scopus and the Islamic World Science Citation Database.

References

External links

Quarterly journals
Publications established in 2004
2004 establishments in Iran
English-language journals
Works about geopolitics
Political science journals
Geography journals